A Man, a Real One (French title: Un homme, un vrai) is a 2003 French comedy-drama film directed by Arnaud Larrieu and Jean-Marie Larrieu.

Plot
Boris, an apprentice film director, meets Marilyne, a young senior executive, during an evening in Paris and they declare their love for one another, despite their barely knowing each other. Five years later, during a business trip to the Balearic Islands, with Boris and their children, Marilyne runs away at the very moment when Boris is going to leave her. Five years down the road, Marilyne reappears at the other end of the Pyrenees mountains, with a group of Americans. The man who will be their guide is none other than Boris, who is unrecognisable.

Cast
Mathieu Amalric as Boris
Hélène Fillières as Marilyne
Pierre Pellet as Toni
Philippe Suner as Jean-Claude
Eva Ionesco as assistant producer

References

External links

2003 films
2003 comedy-drama films
French LGBT-related films
Films directed by Arnaud Larrieu
Films directed by Jean-Marie Larrieu
2003 LGBT-related films
LGBT-related comedy-drama films
French comedy-drama films
2000s French films